Salomé Stampfli (born 9 June 2005) is a Liechtensteiner footballer who plays as a midfielder in the youth team of St. Gallen-Staad and for the Liechtenstein national football team.

International career
Stampfli made her senior debut for Liechtenstein in a friendly against Gibraltar on 26 November 2021.

Career statistics

International

International goals

References

External links
 Salomé Stampfli at the Liechtenstein Football Association

2005 births
Living people
Women's association football midfielders
Liechtenstein women's international footballers
Liechtenstein women's footballers